Lamongan Regency is a regency (kabupaten) of East Java, Indonesia. At the 2010 census it had a population of 1,179,059; the 2020 Census produced a total of 1,379,628. The regency seat is the town of Lamongan.

Lamongan Regency is surrounded by:
Northern side  :  Java Sea
Southern side  :  Mojokerto Regency and Jombang Regency
Eastern side   :  Gresik Regency
Western side   :  Tuban Regency and Bojonegoro Regency

The economy is mainly supported by agriculture, fishery, and commerce, especially home industry.

Administrative districts 
Lamongan Regency consists of twenty-seven districts (kecamatan), tabulated below with their areas and population totals from the 2010 Census and the 2020 Census. The table also includes the number of administrative villages (rural desa and urban kelurahan) in each district, and its postal codes.

Climate
Lamongan has a tropical savanna climate (Aw) with moderate to little rainfall from May to November and heavy rainfall from December to April. The following climate data is for the town of Lamongan.

Paciran Port 
On 29 April 2013, Paciran Port (Class I ASDP) was officially opened to support the overloaded Tanjung Perak Port.

Sport 
Persela is a football team based in Lamongan. Former Persela Lamongan goalkeeper Choirul Huda was from Lamongan.

References 

Regencies of East Java